Fahlband (from the German fahl for "faded" + band) is a stratum in crystalline rock, containing metallic minerals.

References

Petrology
Ore deposits